Kiany Vroman (born 21 January 2004) is a Belgian professional footballer who plays as a goalkeeper for Club NXT.

References

External links 

 
 

2004 births
Living people
Belgian footballers
Association football goalkeepers
Club Brugge KV players
Club NXT players
Challenger Pro League players

Belgium youth international footballers